Eupithecia muscistrigata is a moth in the  family Geometridae. It is found in Brazil.

References

Moths described in 1906
muscistrigata
Moths of South America